Events in the year 1807 in India.

Incumbents
T Earl of Minto, Governor-General, 1807-13.

Events
 National income - 11,794 million

Law

References

 
India
Years of the 19th century in India